Gulf Drilling International Limited (GDI) is a Qatari Shareholding Company based in West Bay, Doha.

History
Gulf Drilling International was established on 18 May 2004 as the first drilling contractor in the State of Qatar. GDI was originally formed as a joint venture between QatarEnergy (60% share) and Japan Drilling Co. Ltd (JDC - 40% share). In July 2007, QP acquired a 10% share from JDC, raising its ownership to 70%. On 12 February 2008, GDI's shares held by QP were transferred to Gulf International Services Q.S.C. (GIS).

In April 2014, GIS signed a Share Purchase Agreement (SPA) with JDC to acquire JDC's remaining 30% shareholding of GDI. This made GDI a wholly owned subsidiary of GIS as of 1 May 2014.

GIS is a public shareholding company owned by individual investors and select institutions, including QP. It is the largest oil sector services company in Qatar, and its shares are listed on the Qatar Exchange. GIS also holds 100% shares of Gulf Helicopters Company Q.S.C., Al-Koot Insurance and Reinsurance Company S.A.Q. and Amwaj Catering Services Q.S.C.

In May 2019, GDI was awarded six of the eight offshore jackup drilling rigs to execute the North Field Expansion Project with drilling activities starting in January 2020.  Following the award, GDI has formed 50:50 joint venture with Seadrill Limited to manage and operate five jackup rigs with QatarEnergy. The five contracts are worth of $656 million.

Services
GDI specializes in the provision of drilling rig and associated services to the oil and gas exploration and production companies operating in the State of Qatar. GDI currently has nine offshore jack-up drilling rigs, six land rigs, one accommodation barge and one lift boat, under operation. GDI also has a lift boat on contract through a vessel it is managing on behalf of its owner.

GDI currently holds 60% share of the offshore drilling market and a 100% share of the onshore drilling market in the State of Qatar. Within Qatar, GDI's client base includes QatarEnergy and other international oil and gas operators conducting well operations. GDI's international oil company clients include: Qatar Shell Services Company W.L.L. (Shell), North Oil Co., Occidental Petroleum of Qatar Ltd. (Oxy), Maersk Oil Qatar (MOQ), Qatargas, JX-Nippon Oil & Gas Exploration Corporation (JX-Nippon), QatarEnergy Development Company and Dolphin Energy Limited (Dolphin).

GDI continues to expand its scope, footprint and market share. The company has taken delivery of its latest offshore jack-up rig ‘Dukhan’ which started operations from November 2014. In 2014 GDI has signed contracts with shipyards in Singapore and Qatar to build a new jack-up offshore drilling rig (‘Halul’) and a Lift boat (‘Al-Safliya’), respectively. Both assets already have contracts with clients and are expected to start operations in 2016. Al -Safliya would be GDI's the first new-build Liftboat from a shipyard in Qatar.

GDI has also placed orders with a yard in USA to build two new land rigs. With these two new land rigs slated for operations by Q4 2015 & Q1 2016 respectively, GDI will have eight drilling onshore rigs maintaining its 100% market share.

GDI is investing in infrastructure, logistics and associated equipment to support the expansion, which includes: crew accommodations, warehousing and yard facilities, workshop, cranes, water well drilling units, heavy transportation carriers and site preparation equipment.

• GDI celebrated its 10th anniversary in 2014.

• GDI had its best safety record ever since its inception, with a TRIR of 0.32, in 2014.

• GDI's revenue and net profit was an all-time high in 2014.

• Year ending 2014 GDI had 1713 employees, including  136 Qatari Nationals who account for 8% of GDI's total work force.

• GDI is an ISO 9001, ISO 14001 and OHSAS 18001 certified company.

• As a growth oriented company, GDI has doubled the number of rigs from 9 to 18 in the span of just 4 years, as part of its business expansion plan.

• GDI is a member of the International Association of Drilling Contractors (IADC) and the Drops forum (Dropped Objects Prevention Scheme).

• GDI has many employees who are members of the Society of Petroleum Engineers (SPE) and therefore involved in the Qatar Society of Petroleum Engineers (QSPE). GDI is represented in the ABS Middle East Regional Committee and the Special Committee on Mobile Offshore Units.

• GDI is also a member of the GCC National Drilling Contractors Exchange Forum

Fleet status as of January 2019

References

Oil and gas companies of Qatar
Qatari companies established in 2004
Non-renewable resource companies established in 2004
Companies based in Doha